Ronald F. Ferguson (born 1950) in Cleveland, Ohio is an economist who researches factors that affect educational achievement.  Major themes in his work include the race-related achievement gap in the United States and how to improve schools and identify effective teachers.

Education
Ferguson earned an undergraduate degree in economics from Cornell University and a PhD in economics from the Massachusetts Institute of Technology.

Career
Ferguson was appointed to Harvard University in 1983.

He is currently a Senior Lecturer in Education and Public Policy with a joint appointment to the Harvard Graduate School of Education and the Harvard Kennedy School. Ferguson also serves as a fellow for the Malcolm Wiener Center for Social Policy. He is one of the founders and the current faculty director of the Achievement Gap Initiative at Harvard University. Ferguson sits on the Board of Directors of The Basics, Inc., a nonprofit aimed to improve the basic foundational skills of early childhood caregiving and development, which stems from works of the Academic Gap Initiative. In 2014, Ferguson co-founded The Tripod Education Partners, Inc. Additionally, he is one of the co-owners of Freshpond Education, Inc.

The Tripod Project 
The Tripod Project, founded in 2014, is a student survey system that was developed by Ferguson, with the intent of using student feedback to understand effective teaching strategies. The survey is administered by Cambridge Education, a consulting group that analyzes the results and releases their reports back to schools. From 2009- 2010, the Gates Foundation sponsored the Measures of Effective Teaching Project. In that project, nearly 3,000 K-12 teachers in more than 6 districts administered the survey as a byproduct of the initiative. The survey has also gone international, reaching classrooms in both China and Canada.

Specifically, in 2009, the Pittsburg School District distributed the student survey to 250 classrooms as part of a pilot program. In 2011, the program expanded, implementing the survey in nearly 1,300 classrooms. However, in 2012, Bill Hileman, Vice President of the local teachers union, Pittsburgh Federation of Teachers, expressed reluctance in immediately factoring the survey results into teacher evaluations. A public debate surrounding the potential role of such survey results surfaced in 2012. The Tripod Education Partners, Inc. ended its collaboration with Cambridge Education in 2014.

The survey structure consists of using a 5-point scale where the student agrees or disagrees with the listed statement. Statements include:

 Our class stays busy and does not waste time.
 I understand what I am supposed to be learning in this class.
 If I don't understand something, my teacher explains it another way.
 My teacher pushes everyone to work hard.
 My teacher takes the time to summarize what we learn each day.

Ferguson found a correlation between high survey responses and overall classroom performance calculated at the end of the year. He argues that students of teachers with high ratings perform a complete semester better than students of teachers who received lower ratings in comparison to their counterparts. Furthermore, anonymous responses are said to increase the accuracy of the study. Critics have argued that there is an "immediate objection" from many teachers who question the value in children evaluating their instructors. Researchers counter this argument by highlighting the fact that teachers spend "hundreds more hours" with their students than with any other administrator, making them valuable assets in improving classrooms.

Personal life 
Ronald Ferguson has been married for 38 years to his spouse. He is the father of two adult sons.

Research
Beginning in 1980, Ferguson initially concentrated his research on the issues surrounding economic and community development. Later this resulted in the publication of his social science synthesis volume Urban Problems and Community Development (1999). Gradually, in the latter portion of the decade, Ferguson's research shifted and began to focus on education and youth development. His work has been published by numerous organizations including, but not limited to, the U.S. Department of Education, the National Research Council, and the Brookings Institution.

In December 2007, Ferguson's book Toward Excellence with Equity: An Emerging Vision for Closing the Achievement Gap was published by Harvard Education Press and released to the public.

Ferguson's research for the past decade has focused on education and school improvement, with a focus on racial achievement gaps.

Publications

Books 

 Ferguson, Ronald F. "Urban Problems and Community Development".  Brookings Institution Press; 1999.    
 Ferguson, Ronald F. Toward Excellence with Equity: An Emerging Vision for Closing the Achievement Gap. Harvard Education Press; 2008. .
 Ferguson, Ronald F. and Robertson, Tatsha  The Formula: Unlocking the Secrets to Raising Highly Successful Children. BenBella Books;  2020. .

Book Chapters 

 Ferguson, Ronald, and Eric Hirsch. "How Working Conditions Predict Teaching Quality and Student Outcomes." Designing Teacher Evaluation Systems: New Guidance form the Measures of Effective Teaching Project. Ed. Thomas J. Kane, Kerri A. Kerr, and Robert C. Pianta. Jossey-Bass, July 2014.
 Ferguson, Ronald, and Charlotte Danielson. "How Framework for Teaching and Tripod 7Cs Evidence Distinguish Key Components of Effective Teaching." Designing Teacher Evaluation Systems: New Guidance form the Measures of Effective Teaching Project. Ed. Thomas J. Kane, Kerri A. Kerr, and Robert C. Pianta. Jossey-Bass, July 2014.

Academic Journal/Scholarly Articles 

 Ferguson, Ronald. "Elements of a 21st Century Movement for Excellence with Equity." Journal of Negro Education 83.2 (Spring 2014): 103-120

Research Papers/Reports 

 Ferguson, Ronald F., with Sarah F. Phillips, Jacob F. S. Rowley, and Jocelyn W. Friedlander. "The Influence of Teaching Beyond Standardized Test Scores: Engagement, Mindsets, and Agency." The Achievement Gap Initiative at Harvard University, October, 2015.
 Ferguson, Ronald, Jason Snipes, Farhana Hossain, and Michelle S. Manno. "Developing Positive Young Adults: Lessons from Two Decades of YouthBuild Programs." MDRC Research Report, May 2015.
 Ferguson, Ronald, and Sara Lamback. "Creating Pathways to Prosperity: A Blueprint for Action." The Pathways to Prosperity Project, Harvard Graduate School of Education, and the Achievement Gap Initiative at Harvard University, June 2014.
 Ferguson, Ronald. "Pathways to Prosperity: Meeting the Challenge of Preparing Teens and Young Adults for the 21st Century." Pathways to Prosperity Project, Harvard Graduate School of Education, February 2011.

References

External links
 Changing How Teachers Improve, about Ferguson's work on student evaluation of teachers

Living people
21st-century American economists
Economics educators
Harvard Kennedy School faculty
1950 births
MIT School of Humanities, Arts, and Social Sciences alumni
Cornell University alumni
Race and education in the United States
Harvard Graduate School of Education faculty